Fancy may refer to:

Music

Albums
 Fancy (Bobbie Gentry album), 1970
 Fancy (Idiot Flesh album), 1997
 Fancy (video), a 2007 video album by Les Claypool

Songs
 "Fancy" (Bobbie Gentry song), 1969, covered by Reba McEntire in 1990
 "Fancy" (Destiny's Child song), 2001
 "Fancy" (Drake song), 2010
 "Fancy" (Iggy Azalea song), 2014
  "Fancy" (Doja Cat song), 2018
 "Fancy" (Twice song), 2019

Other music
 Fantasia (music), also known as fancy, a type of musical composition
 Fancy (band), an early-mid 1970s pop group

People
 Fancy (surname)
 Fancy Ray McCloney, American stand-up comedian and advertising pitchman
 Fancy (singer), German Eurodance and Euro Disco artist Manfred Alois Segieth (born 1946)

Fictional characters
 Arthur Fancy, on the TV series NYPD Blue
 Fancy Crane, on the soap opera Passions
 Fancy-Fancy, in the animated sitcom series Top Cat
 Fancy Lala, the main character of the Japanese anime series of the same name
 'Fancy' Smith on UK TV's Z Cars

Places
 Fancy, Saint Vincent and the Grenadines, a settlement
 Fancy River, Saint Vincent and the Grenadines

Ships
 , three Royal Navy vessels
 , a World War II minesweeper
 Fancy (ship), a frigate commanded by pirate Henry Every from 1694 to 1695

Other uses
 Fancy.com, a social photo sharing website and app

See also
 Fancy Farm (disambiguation)
 Fancy goods